Fjotland is a former municipality in the old Vest-Agder county, Norway. The  municipality existed from 1838 until 1841 and again from 1858 until its dissolution in 1963. The administrative centre was the village of Fjotland where Fjotland Church is located.  The municipality covered the northern part of the Kvinesdalen valley in the present-day municipality of Kvinesdal.

History
The parish of Fjotland was established as a municipality on 1 January 1838 (see formannskapsdistrikt law), but the municipality was short-lived.  In 1841, Fjotland (population: 980) was merged into the neighboring municipality of Kvinesdal.  This union, however, only lasted until 1858 when Fjotland was separated to form its own municipality again. At that time, Fjotland had a population of 1,044. 

On 1 January 1874, an unpopulated area of Fjotland was transferred to neighboring Sirdal municipality.  On 1 January 1903, a small area of Sirdal (population: 63) was transferred to Fjotland.  During the 1960s, many Norwegian municipalities were consolidated due to the work of the Schei Committee.  On 1 January 1963, Fjotland (population: 1,244) was dissolved and it was merged with Kvinesdal (again) and Feda municipality to form a new, larger municipality of Kvinesdal.

Name
The name of the municipality (originally the parish) comes from the old Fjotland farm. The first element in the name comes from the word fjøs which means "barn" and the last element in the name comes from the word land which means "land".

Government
All municipalities in Norway, including Fjotland, are responsible for primary education (through 10th grade), outpatient health services, senior citizen services, unemployment and other social services, zoning, economic development, and municipal roads.  The municipality was governed by a municipal council of elected representatives, which in turn elected a mayor.

Municipal council
The municipal council  of Fjotland was made up of representatives that were elected to four year terms.  The party breakdown of the final municipal council was as follows:

See also
List of former municipalities of Norway

References

Kvinesdal
Former municipalities of Norway
1838 establishments in Norway
1840s disestablishments in Norway
1848 establishments in Norway
1963 disestablishments in Norway